The 1977 National Rowing Championships was the sixth edition of the National Championships, held from 15–17 July 1977 at the National Water Sports Centre in Holme Pierrepont, Nottingham. London won the John Player Trophy (men's Victor Ludorum) and Thames won the Charlton Cup (women's Victor Ludorum).

Senior

Medal summary

Lightweight

Medal summary

Junior

Medal summary

Veteran

Medal summary 

Key

References 

British Rowing Championships
British Rowing Championships
British Rowing Championships